= Guradiya =

- village
- Location within Madhya Pradesh Location within India
- Coordinates: 23.3679602°N 77.328135°E
- Country: India
- State: Madhya Pradesh
- District: Bhopal
- Tehsil: Huzur
- Elevation: 502 m (1,647 ft)

Population (2011)
  - Total: 549
- Time zone: UTC+5:30 (IST)
- ISO 3166 code: MP-IN
- 2011 census code: 482358

Guradiya is a village in the Bhopal district of Madhya Pradesh, India. It is located in the Huzur tehsil and the Phanda block.

== Demographics ==
According to the 2011 census of India, Guradiya has 124 households. The effective literacy rate (i.e. the literacy rate of population excluding children aged 6 and below) is 56.73%.

Demographics (2011 Census)
| | Total | Male | Female |
|---|---|---|---|
| Population | 549 | 293 | 256 |
| Children aged below 6 years | 103 | 57 | 46 |
| Scheduled caste | 539 | 286 | 253 |
| Scheduled tribe | 0 | 0 | 0 |
| Literates | 253 | 156 | 97 |
| Workers (all) | 291 | 159 | 132 |
| Main workers (total) | 128 | 114 | 14 |
| Main workers: Cultivators | 35 | 31 | 4 |
| Main workers: Agricultural labourers | 34 | 32 | 2 |
| Main workers: Household industry workers | 0 | 0 | 0 |
| Main workers: Other | 59 | 51 | 8 |
| Marginal workers (total) | 163 | 45 | 118 |
| Marginal workers: Cultivators | 32 | 8 | 24 |
| Marginal workers: Agricultural labourers | 118 | 27 | 91 |
| Marginal workers: Household industry workers | 0 | 0 | 0 |
| Marginal workers: Others | 13 | 10 | 3 |
| Non-workers | 258 | 134 | 124 |
